Athletics Papua New Guinea (Athletics PNG) is the governing body for the sport of athletics in Papua New Guinea.  Current president is Tony Green.  He was re-elected in July 2009.

History 
Athletics PNG was founded in 1961, and was affiliated to the IAAF in the year 1962.

Affiliations 
World Athletics
Oceania Athletics Association (OAA)
Moreover, it is part of the following national organisations:
Papua New Guinea Olympic Committee (PNGOC)

National records 
Athletics PNG maintains the Papua New Guinean records in athletics.

External links
Facebook

References 

Papua New Guinea
Sport in Papua New Guinea
Athletics in Papua New Guinea
National governing bodies for athletics
Sports organizations established in 1961
1961 establishments in Papua New Guinea